Isopachys anguinoides, commonly known as the Thai snake skink or Heyer's isopachys, is a species of skink in the family Scincidae.

Geographic range
I. anguinoides is found in Thailand and Myanmar.

References

Further reading
Boulenger GA. 1914. Descriptions of New Reptiles from Siam. J. Nat. Hist. Soc. Siam 1: 67–70. (Lygosoma anguinoides, new species, pp. 67–68).

External links
 Flickr Photo by Michael Cota
 Species of Kaeng Krachan National Park, Thailand

Isopachys
Reptiles of Myanmar
Reptiles of Thailand
Reptiles described in 1914
Taxa named by George Albert Boulenger